Neforoshchanka (Neforoşça) is a rural locality (a selo) in Nigmatullinsky Selsoviet, Alsheyevsky District, Bashkortostan, Russia. The population was 173 as of 2010. There are 2 streets.

Geography 
Neforoshchanka is located 48 km southeast of Rayevsky (the district's administrative centre) by road. Belyakovka is the nearest rural locality.

References 

Rural localities in Alsheyevsky District